Hammer Point is a rocky point projecting from the north coast of Robert Island in the South Shetland Islands, Antarctica into Drake Passage, and forming the southwest side of the entrance to Nevestino Cove and the northeast side of the entrance to Clothier Harbour. The point forms the north extremity of the minor Boatin Island connected to Robert Island on the south by a 250 m long moraine tombolo. The area was visited by early 19th century sealers operating from Clothier Harbour.

The feature is descriptively named from its shape.

Location

Maps
 L.L. Ivanov. Antarctica: Livingston Island and Greenwich, Robert, Snow and Smith Islands. Scale 1:120000 topographic map.  Troyan: Manfred Wörner Foundation, 2009.

References
 SCAR Composite Antarctic Gazetteer.

Headlands of Robert Island